The Queen of Arsion Championship was a women's professional wrestling championship owned by the Hyper Visual Fighting Arsion promotion. Like most professional wrestling championships, the title was won as a result of a scripted match. The championship, which was situated at the top of Arsion's championship hierarchy, was introduced on December 18, 1998, when Mariko Yoshida defeated Candy Okutsu to become the inaugural champion. The two contestants had earlier in the year won separate tournaments to qualify for the match. During the next four and a half years, there were eight reigns shared among six different wrestlers. The title was retired on August 24, 2003, two months after the folding of Arsion, when Yoshida defeated Mima Shimoda to become the final champion.

Reigns
Mariko Yoshida was the first champion in the title's history. She also holds the records for most reigns, with three, and for the shortest reign in the title's history at less than one day. Aja Kong holds the record for the longest reign in the title's history at 485 days. Overall, there were eight reigns shared among six different wrestlers.

Title history

Combined reigns

See also
AAAW Single Championship
JWP Openweight Championship
WWWA World Single Championship

References

External links
Queen of Arsion Championship history at Wrestling-Titles.com
Queen of Arsion Championship history at Solie's Title Histories

Arsion championships
Women's professional wrestling championships